Petland Discounts was a privately owned chain of pet stores based in Brentwood, New York. The company was founded in 1965 with a store in Glen Oaks, New York. At its peak, Petland Discounts had expanded up to 100 stores and served the states of New York, New Jersey, and Connecticut.

Petland Discounts was also involved in providing a school program teaching students and introducing an experience with pets to children of all ages.

History
Petland Discounts began in September 1965 when Neil Padron opened up his first store in Queens. Its name was originally used as a concept of a tropical fish store, selling various aquatic merchandise.

After 50 years, Petland Discounts had expanded up to 100 stores in the New York-New Jersey-Connecticut tri-state area, while offering a full line of pet supplies, such as live fish, birds, and small animals.

On January 14, 2019, Neil Padron died of bladder cancer. He was 74.

On January 18, 2019, the chain filed notice with the New York State Department of Labor that it would likely be closing all of its stores. They were all shuttered as of April 18, 2019. Declining sales brought on by price competition with online vendors were blamed for the possible closures.

The Humane Society pledge
While there was talk of New York banning the sale of pets, Petland Discounts had gone towards becoming a puppy-friendlier pet store. In June 2010, 62 stores in New York City had signed The Humane Society of the United States pledge against Puppy Mills, stating that the chain would not sell puppies, but instead supported local animal adoption programs and taught customers on how to locate a reputable breeder.

"This company sets a positive example of corporate responsibility for other businesses to follow," said Stephanie Shain, senior director of the HSUS' puppy mills campaign.  Petland Discounts chain had never sold puppies, supported animal shelters and pet adoption, and was part of the solution to the puppy mill problem."

Slogans
 "Petland Discounts. For people who care for pets." (mid–late 1980s)
 "Petland Discounts. At Petland we care." (Late 1980s–early 1990s)
 "Petland Discounts. For the best care a pet can get." (Early 1990s–2000s)

References

External links
Official Website
Low Cost Pet Vax
Pet Supplies For Cats
https://calmingdogbeds.co.uk/

Pet stores
Pets in the United States
Companies based in New York (state)
Retail companies of the United States
American companies established in 1965
Retail companies established in 1965
Retail companies disestablished in 2019
Companies that have filed for Chapter 7 bankruptcy